Wirmandi Sugriat (born 5 August 1971) is an Indonesian swimmer. He competed in four events at the 1988 Summer Olympics.

References

External links
 

1971 births
Living people
Indonesian male swimmers
Olympic swimmers of Indonesia
Swimmers at the 1988 Summer Olympics
Place of birth missing (living people)
Asian Games medalists in swimming
Asian Games bronze medalists for Indonesia
Southeast Asian Games medalists in swimming
Swimmers at the 1986 Asian Games
Swimmers at the 1990 Asian Games
Medalists at the 1986 Asian Games
Medalists at the 1990 Asian Games
Southeast Asian Games gold medalists for Indonesia
Southeast Asian Games silver medalists for Indonesia
Southeast Asian Games bronze medalists for Indonesia
Competitors at the 1987 Southeast Asian Games
20th-century Indonesian people
21st-century Indonesian people